Phalodi Junction railway station is a railway station in Jodhpur district, Rajasthan. Its code is PLCJ. It serves Phalodi town. The station consists of three platforms. Passenger, Express, and Superfast trains halt here.

Trains

The following trains halt at Phalodi Junction railway station in both directions:

 Malani Express
 Leelan Express
 Jaisalmer–Jodhpur Express
 Ranikhet Express
 Howrah–Jaisalmer Superfast Express
 Bandra Terminus–Jaisalmer Superfast Express
 Jaisalmer–Lalgarh Express
 Bhavnagar Terminus–Udhampur Janmabhoomi Express
 Corbett Park Link Express

References

Railway stations in Jodhpur district
Jodhpur railway division